Robin Hood's Butts are a group of nine Bronze Age barrows near Otterford on the Blackdown Hills in Somerset, England. They have been scheduled as ancient monuments.

Description

Four are bowl shaped and the other a bell barrow.

Origin of names

The origin of the name is unknown, however local folklore describes their use by Robin Hood and Little John to play quoits. The name is known to have been used since the 19th century appearing on a tithe map created in 1844.

References

Scheduled monuments in Taunton Dene
Archaeological sites in Somerset